James Crosby may refer to:

James Crosby (banker) (born 1956), British businessman and former deputy chairman of the Financial Services Authority
James V. Crosby (born 1952), former U.S. public figure, jailed for corruption
Jim Crosby (1873–1960), South African rugby union player
James M. Crosby (1927–1986), international chairman of Resorts International Inc., see Paradise Island